Timar Lewis (born 11 April 1998) is a Jamaican footballer who plays for  Harbour View  as a winger.

Career
Lewis is a left-footed midfielder who has played both in the defence at left back and on the left side of midfield. He made his professional debut for Sandals South Coast F.C. during the 2017–18 National Premier League season. On 15 October 2017 he scored his first goal as a professional with Sandals in a 1-1 draw with Cavalier SC.

During August 2018 Lewis joined Harbour View. He scored his first goal with the club on 17 December 2018 in a 3-0 victory over Montego Bay United.

During February 2019 he went on trial with New York Red Bulls II.

Career statistics

References

External links
 
 

1999 births
Living people
Jamaican footballers
Jamaican expatriate footballers
Jamaica international footballers
Association football defenders
Harbour View F.C. players
National Premier League players
People from Westmoreland Parish